Ynysygerwn Football Club is a Welsh football club based in Aberdulais, situated approximately two miles from Neath town centre. The club currently competes in the Ardal Leagues South West, the third tier of the Welsh football pyramid. 

Ynysygerwn has three senior football sides along with a youth academy which runs teams from Under 6s to Under 18s. The first team currently play their home games at Llandarcy Academy of Sport, home of The Ospreys training ground, while the rest of the teams play at Ynysygerwn Cricket Club. The club's President is Tottenham Hotspur and Wales player Ben Davies.

History
Ynysgerwyn Football Club was founded in 1981 by members of the Town's cricket club as a way for the players to stay fit when the cricket season ended. The club entered the amateur Neath & District League. The club achieved promotion in 1985 and by the early 1990s had reached the First Division. In the 1991–92 season, Ynysgerwyn finished First Division champions.

The team remained in the top tiers of the Neath & District League, achieving a third placed finished in 2014. Two years later, the club won promotion to the Welsh Football League during the 2015–16 season for the first time in its history, defeating Team Swansea in a play-off match in May 2016 having finished as runners-up. The side also won the Neath & District League Cup for the first time in its history in the same season.

Wales International defender Ben Davies was named club president in the 2010s. Davies had previously played cricket for the club as a teenager.

References
 

Football clubs in Wales
Welsh Football League clubs
Ardal Leagues clubs
Association football clubs established in 1981
1981 establishments in Wales
Neath & District League clubs